"Big City Nights" is a song by German metal band Scorpions. The song was released as the sixth track of their 1984 album Love at First Sting. Like many Scorpions songs, "Big City Nights" was composed by band members Rudolf Schenker and Klaus Meine. The song was also released as the third single from the album in 1984, with the B-side being "Bad Boys Running Wild". The guitar solo is performed by Rudolf Schenker.

The band created a music video for the song. The video is a live version of the song taken from concert footage of their 1984 Love at First Sting world tour. A different version can be seen on their World Wide Live concert documentary home video released in 1985.

Charts

References

Scorpions (band) songs
1984 singles
Songs written by Rudolf Schenker
Songs written by Klaus Meine
1984 songs
Harvest Records singles